Listed below are the dates and results for the 1982 FIFA World Cup qualification rounds for the South American zone (CONMEBOL). For an overview of the qualification rounds, see the article 1982 FIFA World Cup qualification.

A total of 10 CONMEBOL teams entered the competition. The South American zone was allocated 4 places (out of 24) in the final tournament. Argentina, the defending champions, qualified automatically, leaving 3 spots open for competition between 9 teams.

The 9 teams were divided into 3 groups of 3 teams each. The teams would play against each other on a home-and-away basis. The group winners would qualify.

CONMEBOL Group 1

 

 

 

 

 

Brazil qualified.

CONMEBOL Group 2

 

 

 

 

 

Peru qualified.

CONMEBOL Group 3

 

 

 

 

 

Chile qualified.

Qualified teams
The following four teams from CONMEBOL qualified for the final tournament.

1 Bold indicates champions for that year. Italic indicates hosts for that year.

Goalscorers

5 goals

 Zico

3 goals

 Carlos Aragonés
 Hernán Darío Herrera

2 goals

 Sócrates
 Tita
 Carlos Caszely
 Patricio Yáñez
 Guillermo La Rosa
 Julio César Uribe
 Julio Morales
 Waldemar Victorino

1 goal

 Miguel Aguilar
 Jesús Reynardo
 Júnior
 Reinaldo
 Miguel Ángel Neira
 Carlos Rivas
 Pedro Sarmiento
 Wilson Nieves
 Lupo Quiñónez
 Miguel María Michelagnoli
 Eugenio Morel
 Julio César Romero
 Gerónimo Barbadillo
 Rubén Paz
 Pedro Acosta

See also
1982 FIFA World Cup qualification (UEFA)
1982 FIFA World Cup qualification (CONCACAF)
1982 FIFA World Cup qualification (CAF)
1982 FIFA World Cup qualification (AFC and OFC)

References

CONMEBOL
FIFA World Cup qualification (CONMEBOL)
World